Paraivongius varicolor is a species of leaf beetle from Nigeria and the Democratic Republic of the Congo, described by Édouard Lefèvre in 1891.

References

Eumolpinae
Beetles of the Democratic Republic of the Congo
Beetles described in 1891
Insects of West Africa
Taxa named by Édouard Lefèvre